"The Hostage" is a song by American singer Donna Summer from her debut studio album, Lady of the Night (1974), which was released exclusively in the Netherlands. The track was written by Giorgio Moroder and Pete Bellotte, with the latter also serving as producer. It was issued as a 7-inch single in Europe and Asia in 1974, later being included in the German and French versions of Summer's 1975 album Love to Love You Baby. In the lyrics, Summer plays a wife whose husband is kidnapped. By 1978, The Hostage has sold 500,000 copies.

Charts

References 

1974 singles
1974 songs
Donna Summer songs
Songs written by Giorgio Moroder
Songs written by Pete Bellotte
Song recordings produced by Pete Bellotte